"Return to Me" is a song with music by Carmen Lombardo and lyrics by Danny Di Minno.   The song was released in 1958 by Dean Martin. Martin recorded the song again in 1961 for his album Dino: Italian Love Songs.

Chart performance
The song spent 22 weeks on the United Kingdom's New Musical Express chart, peaking at No. 2, while reaching No. 1 in the Netherlands, No. 5 on Canada's CHUM Hit Parade, No. 7 in Flanders, and No. 8 on Norway's VG-lista. In the United States, the song reached No. 4 on Billboards Top 100 Sides, No. 4 on Billboards chart of "Best Selling Pop Singles in Stores”, and No. 4 on Billboards chart of "Most Played by Jockeys".

Other versions
Denny Dennis - a single release in the UK in 1958.
Elvis Presley - made a relaxed version of this song in December 1958, while performing military service in Germany, during his stay at the Hotel Grunewald, Bad Nauheim, where he resided.
Connie Francis - for her album More Italian Favorites (1960).
Jerry Vale - included in his album I Have But One Heart (1962).
Marty Robbins released a version of the song in 1978, which reached No. 6 on the Billboard Hot Country Singles chart.
Bob Dylan and his band recorded a version for the third season of The Sopranos in 2001.
Deana Martin recorded "Return to Me" on her second studio album, Volare, released in 2009 by Big Fish Records. 
Tony Bennett and Vicente Fernández for the album Viva Duets (2012)

Popular culture
Dean Martin's version is featured as the title song in the 2000 film Return to Me.
The song plays on the radio in Mafia II, two of the characters even sing the song in Chapter 7.

References

1958 singles
1958 songs
Capitol Records singles
Dean Martin songs
Marty Robbins songs
Tony Bennett songs
Songs written by Carmen Lombardo